Sate Kajang Haji Samuri is a Sate Kajang fast-food restaurant chain in Malaysia. The main headquarters is located in Medan Sate, Kajang, Selangor.

Branches
Among other Sate Kajang Haji Samuri locations are:

Selangor and Klang Valley
 Bangunan Kajang, Selangor Darul Ehsan
 In front of Metro Kajang, Kajang, Selangor Darul Ehsan
  Awan Besar, Shah Alam Expressway (Kesas), Kuala Lumpur
  Kinrara, Shah Alam Expressway (Kesas),  Kuala Lumpur
  Sungai Buloh Overhead Bridge Restaurant, North–South Expressway Northern Route, Selangor Darul Ehsan.
  Dengkil, North–South Expressway Central Link, Selangor Darul Ehsan (Both bound)
  Elmina, Guthrie Corridor Expressway, Selangor Darul Ehsan (north bound)
 Uptown, Damansara Utama, Selangor Darul Ehsan
 Taipan USJ, UEP Subang Jaya, Selangor Darul Ehsan
 Precinct 16, Putrajaya
 Taman Melati, Ulu Kelang, Selangor Darul Ehsan.
 Aked MARA, Bngunan MARA, Jalan Raja Laut, Kuala Lumpur
 Kompleks PKNS, Shah Alam, Selangor Darul Ehsan
 Kompleks PKNS, Bangi, Selangor Darul Ehsan
 Selayang Mall, Selayang, Selangor Darul Ehsan
 Bukit Tinggi, Klang

Others
 Taipan, Senawang, Negeri Sembilan Darul Khusus
 Jalan Pantai, Port Dickson, Negeri Sembilan Darul Khusus

References

Further reading
 Best Satay in KL and Selangor. The Malaysian Insider.
 Two satay eateries in Kajang reel in the crowds. The Star.
 Sate Kajang Haji Samuri is top choice. The Star.

Restaurants in Malaysia
Fast-food franchises